List of Los Angeles Metro stations may refer to:
List of Los Angeles Metro Rail stations, list of rapid transit and light rail stations
List of Los Angeles Metro Liner stations, list of bus rapid transit stations